Battle of Tobruk may refer to:
 Battle of Tobruk (1911), an engagement in December 1911 during the Italo-Turkish War
 Battle of Tobruk (1941), the capture of Tobruk by the Allies in January 1941
 Siege of Tobruk, by the Axis from April to November 1941
 Battle of Tobruk (1942), the fall of Tobruk to the Axis in June 1942
 1989 air battle near Tobruk, shootdown of two Libyan MIG-23s